Riccardo Tisci (born 1974) is an Italian fashion designer. He studied in Italy at the Design Istituto d’Arte Applicata in Cantù until the age of 17, and then graduated from London's Central Saint Martins College of Art and Design in 1999. In 2005, Tisci was given the title of creative director for Givenchy Women's haute couture and ready-to-wear lines. In May 2008 he was additionally named as menswear and accessories designer of the Givenchy men's division. In March 2018, it was announced he had been appointed chief creative officer of Burberry, succeeding Christopher Bailey.

Tisci's apparent fascination with Gothic touches (dark, languid dresses for fall couture) and space-age minimalism (one ready-to-wear show featured white-clad models drifting around a sterile-white sphere) has drawn new attention to the Givenchy brand. Reviews and output so far have been mixed and inconsistent, but many, including influential fashion critics (such as Cathy Horyn of The New York Times and Suzy Menkes of the International Herald Tribune) have honed in on Tisci's conceptual leanings, as well as his future potential for revitalizing the Givenchy brand and infusing it with his precision and imagination.

Early life and education 
Tisci was born in Taranto and raised in Como. He graduated from London's Central Saint Martins College of Art and Design in 1999.

Career

Early beginnings 
Upon graduation, Tisci worked for companies such as Puma, Antonio Berardi and Coccapani before signing a three-year contract with Ruffo Research, a company that has helped launch the careers of several fashion designers, such as Sophia Kokosalaki. Tisci has mentioned in an interview that he would like to work with an Iranian brand, although it is not known how realistic his wish is.

Upon the expiration of his contract in July 2004, Tisci spent time living in India, where he began to work on his own collection. In September 2004, during the Milan Fashion Week, Tisci debuted his first Riccardo Tisci Collection for Fall 2005/2006 in an off-calendar show.

Givenchy, 2005–2017 
In February 2005, Tisci was appointed as the creative director of the haute couture, ready-to-wear and accessories lines for Givenchy. Brought to Givenchy by LVMH COO Antonio Belloni and Givenchy CEO Marco Gobbetti, Gobbetti called Tisci a "perfect fit for us... He [Tisci] has an elegance that is very modern, very contemporary and romantic at the same time".

Tisci presented his first Givenchy haute couture collection in July 2005 during the Fashion Week in Paris.

Tisci, under Givenchy, designed the costumes for Madonna's Sticky & Sweet Tour in 2008, following Jean Paul Gaultier and Dolce & Gabbana. In 2009, for the encore of the tour he designed another costume for the tour's opening song Candy Shop.

In February 2017 Tisci stepped down as creative director of Givenchy, "I now wish to focus on my personal interests and passions."

Burberry, 2018–2022 
In 2018, Tisci was named by Burberry to replace Christopher Bailey as the brand's chief creative officer. His tenure lasted through to September 2022 when it was announced that Tisci would be replaced at the helm of Burberry's creative efforts by English designer Daniel Lee.

Style 
Unlike the designers before him who succeeded Mr. Givenchy himself, Tisci has had particular success in haute couture, where he asserts "When I arrived we had five customers. Now we have 29".
Riccardo Tisci's runway presentations are highly stylized in terms of architecture and space. Tisci says of this: "My way of showing is very melancholic... I love romanticism and sensuality".

For the Givenchy Fall-Winter 2010 collection, he included a new model, Lea T, a transgender woman from Brazil, his longtime personal assistant.

Collaborations 
Throughout his career, Tisci's numerous connections and relationships have enabled him to collaborate with well-known artists on various projects:
 2008—Was invited to curate the issue 8 of A-Anna Magazine curated by.
 2010—Celebrated the end of the exhibit The artist is present at a dinner for Marina Abramović; afterwards, she was chosen to appear in a campaign for Spring-Summer 2013 of Givenchy.
 2011—Guest-edited Visionaire's RELIGION issue.
 2011—Collaborated with the perfumer Francois Demachy to make the perfume Le Dahlia Noir.
 2011—Curated issue #8 of A Magazine, in which he featured artwork by Ray Caesar as a source of his creative inspiration.
 2013—Dressed the singer Rihanna for her Diamond World Tour.
 2014—Collaborated with Beyoncé and Jay-Z for the On the Run Tour.
 2014—Collaborated with Nike to create a series of Air Force 1 shoes.
 2016—Launched a 30 piece sportswear collaboration with Nike called NikeLab x RT: Training Redefined, aimed at Olympic athletes for the 2016 Summer Olympics as everyday gym users.
 2018—Collaborated with NikeLab again, creating a fictional basketball team's apparel and footwear. 
In addition to his position at Givenchy, Tisci has collaborated with the choreographers Sidi Larbi Cherkaoui and Damien Jalet on the costume design of the orchestral ballet Boléro by Maurice Ravel at the Opéra Garnier.

Italian model Mariacarla Boscono often appears in his runway shows and ad campaigns, owing possibly to the fact that Tisci has had a friendship with her since before his days at Givenchy.
Tisci also collaborated with American rappers Jay-Z and Kanye West to create the cover for Watch the Throne, as well as the covers for singles H•A•M and Otis. He has also collaborated again with Kanye West for his label GOOD Music on their album Cruel Summer.

References

External links 
 GIVENCHY Official Site

 A MAGAZINE curated by Riccardo Tisci
 A BLOG curated by Riccardo Tisci

Living people
1974 births
Italian fashion designers
Alumni of Central Saint Martins
People from Taranto
Burberry people